Yamzhach is a river in Perm Krai, Russia, a left tributary of the Kolva, which in turn is a tributary of the Vishera. It flows into the Kolva  from the Kolva's mouth. The main tributaries are the Passavozh (left) and Zapadnaya (left) rivers.

References 

Rivers of Perm Krai